Dundee Central Mosque (also known as the Jamia Mosque) is located on the junction of Brown and Miln streets, north-east of the city centre. The original mosque was located on South Erskine Street in 1969, and was moved to 112-114 Hilltown the following year. In 1995, due to the islamic community growing in the city, there was a need for larger premises, which resulted in this mosque being built.

The organization 'Muslims in Britain' classify the Jamia Mosque as Deobandi.

It was the first purpose-built mosque in north-east Scotland, designed and built to face Mecca to the south-east. The architects responsible were Lucas Dow Design Studio. It is trapezoidal and constructed from smooth cream stone with a rounded copper roof.  On each corner is a rounded tower, with a minaret and plain glass at the top. On the south elevation is the mihrab, a semi-circular projection from the wall, with a dome on top. Each elevation has groups of 2 to 4 full-length plain windows, arched in a rectangular frames.  To the south-east of the mosque, at the other end of the car park, is the community centre.

Entrance to the mosque is gained by the northern elevation where shoe shelves line the wall. The male prayer room is located on the ground floor. It is a large bright space, carpeted with gold coloured lines on a red background, indicating where each man should stand. The ceiling is panelled with wood. On the south wall is the mihrab, a semi-circular space with a pulpit for the imams. The bare walls are painted white, showing uniform ashlar bricks. There are book cases in the south and east corner of the room with prayer beads, wooden stands and a clock for prayer time on the southern wall. Outside this room, located in the western corner of the Mosque is the male washroom.

Directly above the male prayer room is the female prayer room. It is smaller, but again with gold lines on the red carpet for women to stand on. On the south wall is a bookshelf with religious texts and toys for small children on the floor. A washroom is separated by a screen to the north/north-west of the worship space.

Imams
Shaykh Abdul Rauf
Hamza ibn Abdurrahman

See also 
Islam in the United Kingdom
Islamic schools and branches
List of mosques
List of mosques in the United Kingdom

References 

2000 establishments in Scotland
Mosques in Scotland
Religion in Dundee
Mosques completed in 2000
Sunni Islam in the United Kingdom
Religious buildings and structures in Dundee
Deobandi mosques